In mathematics, the fundamental theorem of Galois theory is a result that describes the structure of certain types of field extensions in relation to groups. It was proved by Évariste Galois in his development of Galois theory.

In its most basic form, the theorem asserts that given a field extension E/F that is finite and Galois, there is a one-to-one correspondence between its intermediate fields and subgroups of its Galois group. (Intermediate fields are fields K satisfying F ⊆ K ⊆ E; they are also called subextensions of E/F.)

Explicit description of the correspondence
For finite extensions, the correspondence can be described explicitly as follows.
 For any subgroup H of Gal(E/F), the corresponding fixed field, denoted EH, is the set of those elements of E which are fixed by every automorphism in H.
 For any intermediate field K of E/F, the corresponding subgroup is Aut(E/K), that is, the set of those automorphisms in Gal(E/F) which fix every element of K.

The fundamental theorem says that this correspondence is a one-to-one correspondence if (and only if) E/F is a Galois extension.
For example, the topmost field E corresponds to the trivial subgroup of Gal(E/F), and the base field F corresponds to the whole group Gal(E/F).

The notation Gal(E/F) is only used for Galois extensions. If E/F is Galois, then Gal(E/F) = Aut(E/F). In particular, if E/F is not Galois, then F is not the fixed field of any subgroup of Aut(E/F).

Properties of the correspondence
The correspondence has the following useful properties.

 It is inclusion-reversing. The inclusion of subgroups H1 ⊆ H2 holds if and only if the inclusion of fields EH1 ⊇ EH2 holds.
 Degrees of extensions are related to orders of groups, in a manner consistent with the inclusion-reversing property. Specifically, if H is a subgroup of Gal(E/F), then |H| = [E:EH] and |Gal(E/F)|/|H| = [EH:F].
 The field EH is a normal extension of F (or, equivalently, Galois extension, since any subextension of a separable extension is separable) if and only if H is a normal subgroup of Gal(E/F). In this case, the restriction of the elements of Gal(E/F) to EH induces an isomorphism between Gal(EH/F) and the quotient group Gal(E/F)/H.

Example 1

Consider the field

Since  is constructed from the base field  by adjoining , then , each element of  can be written as:

Since the order of the Galois group is equal to the degree of the field extension, there can be no further automorphisms:

which is isomorphic to the Klein four-group. Its five subgroups correspond to the fields intermediate between the base  and the extension . 
 The trivial subgroup  corresponds to the entire extension field .
 The entire group  corresponds to the base field 
 The subgroup corresponds to the subfield  since  fixes .
 The subgroup corresponds to the subfield  since  fixes .
 The subgroup corresponds to the subfield  since  fixes .

Example 2

The following is the simplest case where the Galois group is not abelian.

If we consider K inside the complex numbers, we may take , the real cube root of 2, and  Since ω has minimal polynomial , the extension  has degree:, with -basis  as in the previous example. Therefore the Galois group  has six elements, determined by permutations of the three roots of :Since there are only 3! = 6 such permutations, G must be isomorphic to the symmetric group of all permutations of three objects. The group can be generated by two automorphisms f and g defined by:

Also, g can be considered as the complex conjugation mapping.

The subgroups of G and corresponding subfields are as follows:

 As always, the trivial group {1} corresponds to the whole field K, while the entire group G to the base field .
 The unique subgroup of order 3, corresponds to the subfield  of degree two, since the subgroup has index two in G: i.e. . Its Galois group over the base field is the quotient group , where [g] denotes the coset of g modulo H; that is, its only non-trivial automorphism is the complex conjugation g.
In fact, each subfield contains only a single one of the roots , so none has any non-trivial automorphisms.

Example 3
Let  be the field of rational functions in the indeterminate λ, and consider the group of automorphisms:

here we denote an automorphism  by its value , so that .

 

The Galois correspondence implies that every subfield of  can be constructed this way.

Applications
The theorem classifies the intermediate fields of E/F in terms of group theory. This translation between intermediate fields and subgroups is key
to showing  that the general quintic equation is not solvable by radicals (see Abel–Ruffini theorem). One first determines the Galois groups of radical extensions (extensions of the form F(α) where α is an n-th root of some element of F), and then uses the fundamental theorem to show that solvable extensions correspond to solvable groups.

Theories such as Kummer theory and class field theory are predicated on the fundamental theorem.

Infinite case
Given an infinite algebraic extension we can still define it to be Galois if it is normal and separable. The problem that one encounters in the infinite case is that the bijection in the fundamental theorem does not hold as we get too many subgroups generally. More precisely if we just take every subgroup we can in general find two different subgroups that fix the same intermediate field. Therefore we amend this by introducing a topology on the Galois group.

Let  be a Galois extension (possible infinite) and let  be the Galois group of the extension. Let be the set of the Galois groups of all finite intermediate Galois extension. Stated differently  as an inverse limit of topological groups (where again each  is endowed with the discrete topology). This makes  a profinite group (in fact every profinite group can be realised as the Galois group of a Galois extension, see for example ). Note that when  is finite, the Krull topology is the discrete topology.

Now that we have defined a topology on the Galois group we can restate the fundamental theorem for infinite Galois extensions.

 
 
For a proof see for example.

See also 

 Galois connection

References

External links

Theorems in group theory
Galois theory